"Midnight Highway" is a song written by John McFee and Kurt Howell, and recorded by American country music group Southern Pacific.  The single features former Pablo Cruise member David Jenkins on the lead vocal.  The song was released in April 1988 as the first single from the album Zuma.  The song reached number 14 on the Billboard Hot Country Singles & Tracks chart.

Chart performance

References

1988 singles
1988 songs
Southern Pacific (band) songs
Song recordings produced by Jim Ed Norman
Songs written by John McFee
Warner Records singles